Arden Altino is a musician and producer. Known in the industry as "Keyz", Altino produced numerous records for a wide range of artists such as "Hold On" for Darius Rucker of Hootie & the Blowfish, and "OUT OF MY HEAD" by Lupe Fiasco Featuring Trey Songz. He collaborated with Parisian artists such as Passi and Jocelyne Labylle on several records while adding to his roster of artists, Mary J. Blige, Justin Bieber, Estelle, and P. Diddy. Altino co-produces now with Jerry Wonda out of Platinum Sounds Recording Studio in New York City.

Biography 
Born in Brooklyn and raised in Queens, New York, Arden's talent lies in his combined years of training as a pianist. His understanding of music extends to the R&B, Soul, Hip-Hop, Classical, Jazz, Latin, Kompa and Zouk genres. Altino's Haitian roots and close-knit family influenced his career path and was instrumental in developing him into the Producer/Musician that he is today. The Altino Family is not a stranger to music, his father & uncle played instruments in the church which led him to follow in their footsteps. Arden attended Fiorello Laguardia High School of the Performing Arts and Five Towns College to Study Audio Engineering.

In 1999, and for the next two years, he engineered for various artists including: Busta Rhymes, Tony Touch and Rah Digga. In 2001, he produced also several tunes for Jimmy Cozier including "Gave You Love" and the duet with Alicia Keys "Mr. Man". The multi platinum album "Songs in A Minor" went on to win a Grammy in 2001

Since 2006, Altino's career has been active within the industry. His collaborations include; Patti Labelle., DJ Rekha, Lyfe Jennings, Pharoahe Monch, Aventura, Jay Z, and Wyclef Jean. His musical ambition has led him to sign a business partnership with producer Jerry "Wonda" Duplessis. They continue to work together on various musical projects

Discography

References 

American record producers
21st-century American pianists
Musicians from Brooklyn
Musicians from Queens, New York
American rhythm and blues musicians
American hip hop musicians
American pop pianists
American keyboardists
American reggae musicians
American gospel musicians
Year of birth missing (living people)
Living people